Karen Young (born 13 April 1946 in Sheffield, Yorkshire) is an English-born singer who had a 1969 hit on the UK Singles Chart with "Nobody's Child" (originally by Canadian country singer Hank Snow).

She had other singles released between 1965 and 1971, such as her cover of Cher's #9 hit "You Better Sit Down Kids" (1968), "Allentown Jail" (1969), and "Que Sera Sera"/"One Tin Soldier" (1970), before retiring from the music business in 1974.

Discography

Charting singles

References

External links

1946 births
Living people
English women singers
Musicians from Sheffield